{{Infobox radio show
| show_name     = House of Glass'
| image         = File:House of glass 1935.JPG
| imagesize     = 250px
| caption       = Publicity photo of the cast of The House of Glass. Cast: standing, rear-Arline Blackburn, Paul Stewart, Bertha Walden, Everett Sloane, Joseph Greenwald. Center-Gertrude Berg. Seated-Celia Babcock, Helene Dumas.
| other_names   = 
| format        = 
| runtime       = 
| country       = United States
| language      = English
| home_station  = 
| syndicates    = 
| television    = 
| presenter     = 
| starring      = Gertrude Berg and Joseph Greenwald (1935)Berg and Josef Buloff (1953-1954)
| announcer     = 
| creator       = Gertrude Berg
| writer        = Gertrude Berg
| director      = Gertrude Berg
| senior_editor = 
| editor        = 
| producer      = Gertrude Berg
| exec_producer = 
| narrated      = 
| rec_location  = 
| rem_location  = 
| oth_location  = 
| first_aired   = 
| last_aired    = 
| num_series    = 
| num_episodes  = 
| audio_format  = 
| opentheme     = 
| othertheme    = 
| endtheme      = 
| sponsor       = 
| website       = 
| podcast       = 
}}House of Glass is an American old-time radio serial drama. It was broadcast on the Blue Network from April 17, 1935, until December 25, 1935, and revived on NBC from October 23, 1953, until March 12, 1954.

 1935 version 

 Background 
Gertrude Berg, created House of Glass soon after her previous show, The Goldbergs, was canceled by NBC. Berg had two objectives with House of Glass — "to show Pepsodent [the former show's sponsor] that she could survive without their money" and "to distance herself from Molly Goldberg.FormatHouse of Glass centered around Bessie Glass, a Jewish owner of a hotel, and a variety of eccentric guests who stayed there. A preview newspaper article described Glass as "a shrewish, blustering termigant". The show's introduction invited listeners to enjoy "Bessie Glass and Barney, and the day by day human stories of their little hotel."

Berg's father operated a resort hotel in the Catskill Mountains, which gave her the background for recurring characters in House of Glass -- particularly the head waiter, the bellboy, and the dish washer. She kept the program's characters realistic by frequently mingling with people in Jewish neighborhoods, as she had done for The Goldbergs. Her primary methods of doing so were shopping and chatting with residents on the Lower East Side of New York City and  attending meetings of a women's club in that neighborhood. She used a pseudonym and changed her accent so that people would not recognize her.

Personnel
Berg had four roles — star, producer, director, and writer — with House of Glass Characters and the actors who portrayed them are shown in the table below.

The supporting cast included Bertha Walden, Paul Stewart, and Everett Sloane. Billy Artzt and his orchestra provided music.

Demise
Just as the end of The Goldbergs led to creation of House of Glass, the latter program ended when the former was revived. In 1936, Colgate-Palmolive took on sponsorship of The Goldbergs, leading to a five-year contract worth $1 million to Berg.

 1953-1954 version 
In 1953, NBC brought House of Glass back to radio soon after the televised version of The Goldbergs went off the air. In this version, Berg played Sophie, a cook, who was secretly engaged to the hotel's proprietor, Mr. Glass. The cast and actors are shown in the table below.

The producer was Cherney Berg, son of Gertrude Berg. Gertrude Berg wrote the scripts in longhand, and her husband typed them for the program.

Television
Berg created an original sketch of House of Glass'' and performed it on NBC's "first official television broadcast" in 1940.

References 
 

1935 radio programme debuts
1954 radio programme endings
1930s American radio programs
1950s American radio programs
NBC radio programs
American radio soap operas